Kirkby Stephen is a market town and civil parish in Cumbria, North West England. At the 2001 census the parish had a population of 1,832. In 2011, it had a population of 1,522.

Market
In 1352–1353, Roger de Clifford, Baron of Westmorland, obtained a charter from King Edward III for a market and two annual fairs to be held in the town. This was reaffirmed by a charter granted in 1605 to George, Earl of Cumberland, by King James I, for "one market on Monday and two fairs yearly; one on the Wednesday, Thursday and Friday after Whitsuntide and the other on the two days next before the feast of St Luke."

The Monday market, with livestock sales at the Mart in Faraday Road and stalls on Market Square, remains an important event in the town and surrounding countryside. There were special celebrations to mark the 400th anniversary of the King James charter. St Luke's Fair, or Charter Day, is celebrated every year at the end of October, when the Charter is read at the Charter Stone in Market Street. The special Tup sales, very important in this sheep-rearing area, still take place around this time each year.

Facilities
The town has a range of shops: several antique shops, restaurants, cafés, pubs, and an Upper Eden Visitor Centre. Kirkby Stephen has won several awards from Cumbria/Britain in Bloom.

Kirkby Stephen serves as a base for tourism in the Upper Eden Valley area and for walking tours of the Valley. It is on the route of the Coast to Coast Walk, devised by Alfred Wainwright in 1973. Each June there is held the "Mallerstang Horseshoe and Nine Standards Yomp", which takes a strenuous route along the high ground on both sides of the neighbouring dale of Mallerstang, including Wild Boar Fell and the summit of nearby Nine Standards Rigg.

The surrounding countryside attracts walkers. There is a Kirkby Stephen Mountain Rescue Team to assist those not fully prepared for harsh conditions on the fell tops.

The community and council centre in the library provides information and services for all local councils: county, district and parish.

Parish church

Schools
There are primary schools in Kirkby Stephen and in the neighbouring parishes of Brough and Ravenstonedale.

Secondary education for the town and surrounding area is provided by Kirkby Stephen Grammar School. This was founded in 1566 by Thomas Wharton, 1st Baron Wharton, under letters patent granted by Queen Elizabeth I. Although it has retained the name "grammar school", its old buildings were replaced long ago, and it is now a comprehensive school and Sports College with about 410 pupils. The grounds of the grammar school included for a time an open-air swimming pool built in the 1960s for the school and local community, which was open from May to August to members of the Kirkby Stephen and District Swimming Club and to visitors to the area.

Governance
Kirkby Stephen is in the parliamentary constituency of Penrith and the Border. Neil Hudson was elected its Conservative Member of Parliament at the 2019 General Election, replacing Rory Stewart.

Before Brexit, the town was in the North West England European Parliamentary Constituency.

Kirkby Stephen has a parish council and acts as a centre for villages and parishes that include Nateby, Ravenstonedale and Mallerstang. An electoral ward in the same name stretches south to Aisgill, with a total population at the 2011 Census of 2,580. The town had a 2011 population of 1,522, which was estimated to have risen to 1,647 in 2019.

Scenic highlights

Stenkrith Park is to the south of the town, on the B6259 road to Nateby. The river scenery marks a change from limestone at the head of the Eden Valley in Mallerstang to the red sandstone characteristic further along the Eden Valley. The main rock, from which most houses in Kirkby Stephen are built, is brockram, composed of fragments of limestone in a cement of red sandstone. The river at Stenkrith has carved this rock into many fantastic shapes, collectively known as the Devil's Grinding Mill or Devil's Hole. This natural scenery has been supplemented, in recent years, by three human additions.
The Poetry Path has 12 stones, which were carved by the artist Pip Hall. They bear poems by Meg Peacock that depict a year in the life of a hill farmer.
Eden Benchmark: Beside the river there is a sculpture by Laura White, entitled "Passage", one of the ten "Eden Benchmarks", a series of sculptures that have been placed at intervals along the River Eden from its source in Mallerstang to the Solway Firth.
The Millennium Bridge, opened in 2002, provides pedestrian access from the park to a walk along the old south Durham railway track.

Other scenic features in the area include Nine Standards Rigg to the north-east Pendragon Castle and Wild Boar Fell to the south.

Unlike neighbouring Brough, Kirkby shows no evidence of Roman settlement. However, there are many traces of much more ancient eras in the area, including remains of a large Iron Age earthwork or hill fort known as Croglam Castle, on the south-eastern edge of the town.

Railways
The line keeps to high ground, avoiding any descent into the valleys where possible.

A second, older railway station is Kirkby Stephen East station at the southern edge of the town. Originally a large junction of the South Durham & Lancashire Union Railway and the Eden Valley Railway, the station was reopened by the Stainmore Railway Company in August 2011 as a heritage centre and operational railway representing the 1950s. It is open to visitors every weekend.

Gallery

Location grid

See also

Listed buildings in Kirkby Stephen
List of English and Welsh endowed schools (19th century)

References

External links

Cumbria County History Trust: Kirkby Stephen (nb: provisional research only - see Talk page)
The Northern Viaducts - Upper Eden Valley

 
Market towns in Cumbria
Westmorland
Civil parishes in Cumbria
Towns in Cumbria
Eden District